Battiest is a small, rural unincorporated village in McCurtain County, Oklahoma, United States. The population today is approximately 250 people.  Businesses and services include a post office and comprehensive public school facilities.

Google Maps did not bother to document the village, despite its size and infrastructure.

History
The village was named for Choctaw jurist Byington Battiest.  The post office was established November 1, 1926. Battiest is served by the Battiest Independent School District.

Sources
Shirk, George H. Oklahoma Place Names. Norman: University of Oklahoma Press, 1987.  .

Unincorporated communities in McCurtain County, Oklahoma
Unincorporated communities in Oklahoma